Tarrington is a village in the Southern Grampians Shire in South-west Victoria, Australia close to Hamilton. It has a large Lutheran Church, along with a school, church, hall, oval, cafe/restaurant, computer repair service, quarry, day-care centre and a fire station.

Tarrington was formerly known as Bukecy or Hochkirch, named by Sorbian immigrants coming from the area of that name in Saxony, Germany. The town was settled in the early 1860s and the Hochkirch Post Office opened on 15 February 1861 (now closed and replaced by a hut that houses PO boxes) and renamed Tarrington on 1 March 1918 due to the anti-German sentiment of that time.

See also
 Australian place names changed from German names

References

Towns in Victoria (Australia)